Peter Gordon Saunders  (born 1948) is an Australian social researcher.  He is a professor and Director of the Social Policy Research Centre at the University of New South Wales.  He was elected Fellow of the Academy of the Social Sciences in Australia in 1995 and in the 2022 Queen's Birthday Honours he was appointed an Officer of the Order of Australia.

Bibliography

References

External links
Peter Saunders page at the University of New South Wales
Peter Saunders Curriculum Vitae

1948 births
Australian sociologists
Officers of the Order of Australia
Fellows of the Academy of the Social Sciences in Australia
Living people
Academic staff of the University of New South Wales